Ali Faki (born 20 March 1964) is a Malawian boxer. He competed in the men's featherweight event at the 1984 Summer Olympics.

References

1964 births
Living people
Malawian male boxers
Olympic boxers of Malawi
Boxers at the 1984 Summer Olympics
Place of birth missing (living people)
Featherweight boxers